George Pirie is a Canadian politician, who was elected to the Legislative Assembly of Ontario in the 2022 provincial election. He represents the riding of Timmins as a member of the Progressive Conservative Party of Ontario. He defeated Gilles Bisson who was first elected in 1990, taking the seat from the Ontario New Democratic Party for the first time in 32 years.

He was elected Mayor of Timmins in 2018.

References 

Living people
Progressive Conservative Party of Ontario MPPs
21st-century Canadian politicians
Mayors of Timmins
Year of birth missing (living people)